John Higgin was a professional rugby league footballer who played in the 1930s and 1940s.

Playing career

Challenge Cup Final appearances
John Higgin played right-, i.e. number 3, in Barrow's 4-7 defeat by Salford in the 1938 Challenge Cup Final during the 1937–38 season at Wembley, London on Saturday 7 May 1938.

County Cup Final appearances
John Higgin played right-, i.e. number 3, in Barrow's 4-8 defeat by Warrington in the 1937 Lancashire County Cup Final during the 1937–38 season at Central Park, Wigan on Saturday 23 October 1937.

Testimonial match
John Higgin's Testimonial matches at Barrow were shared with Bob Ayres, Val Cumberbatch, William Little, and Dan McKeating, and took place against Swinton on Saturday 27 April 1946, and against Oldham on Saturday 27 January 1947.

Contemporaneous article extract
"Reliability has been John Higgin’s watchword throughout his service with the Barrow Club – and he has been with them since 1933. He learned his football in the Barrow Schools League."

References

External links
Search for "Higgin" at rugbyleagueproject.org

Date of birth unknown
Place of birth unknown
Year of birth missing
Barrow Raiders players
Rugby league centres
English rugby league players
Year of death missing